Chewawah Creek is a stream in the U.S. state of Mississippi. It is a tributary to Cane Creek.

Scholarly opinions are divided whether the name Chewawah is derived from the Chickasaw language meaning "cedar", or is a corruption of the name of the Mexican state of Chihuahua. Variant names are "Chemew Creek" and "Sawaha Creek".

References

Rivers of Mississippi
Rivers of Chickasaw County, Mississippi
Mississippi placenames of Native American origin